Wilhelm Kunst may refer to:
 Wilhelm Kunst (actor)
 Wilhelm Kunst (sculptor)